A list of , , , and  narrow-gauge railways in the United Kingdom.

See also

British narrow-gauge railways
The Great Little Trains of Wales
Heritage railway
2 ft gauge railroads in the United States
2 ft 6 in gauge railways in the United Kingdom
3 ft gauge railways in the United Kingdom
Large amusement railways
Three foot six inch gauge railways in the United Kingdom

References

 
 
Narrow gauge railways in the United Kingdom